Patrick Rooney may refer to:

 J. Patrick Rooney (1927–2008), American executive and activist
 Patrick Rooney (squash player) (born 1997), English squash player
 Patrick Rooney Jr. (born 1964), American politician